Federal Highway 203 (Carretera Federal 203) is a Federal Highway of Mexico. The highway travels from El Suspiro, Chiapas near Emiliano Zapata, Tabasco in the northwest to Tenosique, Tabasco in the southeast.

References

203